Aeration (also called aerification or aeriation) is the process by which air is circulated through, mixed with or dissolved in a liquid or other substances that act as a fluid (such as soil). Aeration processes create additional surface area in the mixture, allowing greater chemical or suspension reactions.

Aeration of liquids

Methods
Aeration of liquids (usually water) is achieved by:
 passing air through the liquid by means of the Venturi tube, aeration turbines or compressed air which can be combined with diffuser(s) air stone(s), as well as fine bubble diffusers, coarse bubble diffusers or linear aeration tubing. Ceramics are suitable for this purpose, often involving dispersion of fine air or gas bubbles through the porous ceramic into a liquid. The smaller the bubbles, the more gas is exposed to the liquid increasing the gas transfer efficiency. Diffusers or spargers can also be designed into the system to cause turbulence or mixing if desired.

Porous ceramic diffusers are made by fusing aluminum oxide grains using porcelain bonds to form a strong, uniformly porous and homogeneous structure. The naturally hydrophilic material is easily wetted resulting in the production of fine, uniform bubbles.

On a given volume of air or liquid, the surface area changes proportionally with drop or bubble size, the very surface area where exchange can occur. Utilizing extremely small bubbles or drops increases the rate of gas transfer (aeration) due to the higher contact surface area. The pores which these bubbles pass through are generally micrometre-size.

Uses of aeration of liquids

 To smooth (laminate) the flow of tap water at the faucet.
 Production of aerated water or cola for drinking purposes.
 Secondary treatment of sewage or industrial wastewater through use of aerating mixers/diffusers.
 To increase the oxygen content of water used to house animals, such as aquarium fish or fish farm
 To increase oxygen content of wort (unfermented beer) or must (unfermented wine) to allow yeast to propagate and begin fermentation.
 To dispel other dissolved gases such as carbon dioxide or chlorine.
 In chemistry, to oxidise a compound dissolved or suspended in water.
 To induce mixing of a body of otherwise still water.
 Pond aeration.

Aeration of liquid solids

Aeration of soil 

In soil, aeration refers to the extent of air gaps.

Soil aeration is the process of using mechanized or manual equipment to either puncture the soil with spikes (spike aeration) or remove approximately  cores of soil from the ground (core aeration). Aeration may be overlooked when trying to restore a lawn but is vital to bring it back to health.  It improves drainage and reduces puddles formation. 

Spike aeration involves the use of an aeration machine with spikes up to a foot or more in length. It is sometimes used to address drainage issues in areas with turf. Core aeration is done on turf areas as a means of reducing turf compaction, reducing thatch buildup, improving the infiltration of water/nutrients, encouraging deeper roots, and creating an environment where grass seed can have direct contact with the soil. 

There are many types of lawn aerators including walk behind models, ride on versions and tractor pulled versions, as well as spiked shoes.

Liquid aeration involves applying a fortified liquid solution to the lawn. The active ingredient, ammonium lauryl sulfate, is commonly found in soap. The solution breaks down dense particles in the soil and loosens it up, creating beneficial airways. Liquid aeration is a more efficient and less stressful way of loosening soil compaction. Liquid aeration, in combination with liquid fertilizers, is more effective at bringing the pH of the soil back into balance when compared to core aeration. Furthermore, the underlying science shows it significantly lowers soil compaction while conserving the health of current turf.

Aeration in food
Refers to the process in which air is absorbed into the food item. It refers to the lightness of cakes and bread, as measured by the type of pores they contain, and the color and texture of some sauces which have incorporated air bubbles.

In wine tasting, a variety of methods are used to aerate wine and bring out the aromas including swirl wine in the glass, use of a decanter to increase exposure to air, or a specialized wine aerator.

Cider from Asturias is poured into the glass from a height of about 1 metre (el escanciado) to increase aeration.

See also

 Winkler test for dissolved oxygen

References 

Chemical processes
Gas technologies